Monique Gagnon-Tremblay (born May 26, 1940 in Plessisville, Quebec) is a politician in Quebec, Canada. She was the MNA for the riding of Saint-François in the Estrie region from 1985 to 2012. She served as Liberal leader of the Opposition in the National Assembly of Quebec from May 1998 to December 1998 and Deputy Premier in 1994 and from 2003 to 2005.

Education and early career
Gagnon-Tremblay attended the Quirion Business School where she obtained a degree and added a bachelor's degree in arts at the Université Laval and a degree in law and notarial law at the Université de Sherbrooke. She became a notary in Ascot Corner and a lecturer at the Université de Sherbrooke in law. She was also a municipal councilor in Ascot Corner.

Political career

Bourassa government
She was a Liberal candidate in Saint-François in 1981 but lost. She ran again in 1985 and won. She was named the Delegate Minister for the Status of Women and later the Minister of Cultural Communities and Immigration. After being re-elected in 1989, she was renamed the Minister of Cultural Communities. At the end of the mandate, when Daniel Johnson, Jr. replaced Robert Bourassa as Quebec Premier in 1993, she was named the Minister of Finances, the Deputy Premier and the President of the Treasury Board until the Liberals lost to the Parti Québécois in the 1994 elections. She was then the Caucus chair for the PLQ from 1994 to 1996

Interim leader and opposition party
When former Liberal Premier and then leader of the Opposition Daniel Johnson, Jr. decided to quit politics in March 1998, Jean Charest resigned as leader of the federal Progressive Conservative Party to replace Johnson as leader of the Quebec Liberal Party. (The Quebec Liberal Party is not affiliated with the federal Liberal Party of Canada). Gagnon-Tremblay became leader of the Opposition, since Charest did not yet have a seat in the National Assembly.

In the 1998 election, Charest won a seat and replaced Gagnon-Tremblay as leader of the Opposition. She was re-elected for fourth term and named the assistant to Charest.

Charest government
After the Liberals won the 2003 election, Gagnon-Tremblay became deputy premier from May 2003 to February 2005 in the Charest government, and has held various cabinet posts including minister of international relations as well as minister responsible for la francophonie. Re-elected in the 2007 election, she was renamed the Minister of International Relations, La Francophonie and for the Estrie Region as well as the Vice-Chair of the Treasury Board.

Following her 2008 re-election, Gagnon-Tremblay gave up for portfolio of International Relations to Pierre Arcand but was given the position of President of the Treasury Board previously occupied by Monique Jerome-Forget who was also responsible for the portfolio of finances. She was given Jerome-Forget's government administration portfolio duties until 2010. Following Jerome-Forget's retirement, Gagnon-Tremblay was given the portfolio of Infrastructures.  After a 2010 Cabinet shuffle, she returned as Minister of International Relations giving the Treasury Board position to former education Minister Michelle Courchesne.

Electoral District

|-
 
|Liberal
|Monique Gagnon-Tremblay
|align="right"|13,327
|align="right"|46.96
|align="right"|+9.10

|Independent
|François Mailly
|align="right"|210
|align="right"|0.74
|align="right"|
|}

|-
 
|Liberal
|Monique Gagnon-Tremblay
|align="right"|12,528
|align="right"|37.86
|align="right"|

|}

See also
List of Quebec leaders of the Opposition
Politics of Quebec
Quebec general elections
Timeline of Quebec history

External links

 

1940 births
Living people
Women government ministers of Canada
Deputy premiers of Quebec
Finance ministers of Quebec
French Quebecers
Members of the Executive Council of Quebec
Quebec Liberal Party MNAs
Quebec notaries
Université de Sherbrooke alumni
Université Laval alumni
Female finance ministers
Women MNAs in Quebec
21st-century Canadian politicians
21st-century Canadian women politicians